Ivan Pavlovich Ropet (pseudonym of Ivan Nikolaevich Petrov, 1845, Petergof – 1908) was an architect widely regarded as the originator of the Russian Revival in architecture, which is sometimes called the Ropet Style after him. His work was hailed by Vladimir Stasov as "the future of our architecture".

Biography
Raised in the family of his uncle, Ropet studied at the Imperial Academy of Arts under Alexey Gornostaev, pioneer of Russian Revival and a master of tented roof design. Together with Viktor Hartmann, Ropet aspired to revive a truly national style of architecture, based primarily on ornate wooden huts of rural Russia.

Basically, Ropet's circle propagated the same theories of the romantic nationalism as The Five did in regard to Russian music. Between 1874 and 1880, they brought out a series of albums of Russian Architecture Motifs which made their work known throughout Russia. Most of his works were in timber; one of the few still standing is the bath at Abramtsevo.

Ropet made use of the Victorian craze for world's fairs to propagate his ideas abroad. He designed the Russian pavilions at the World's Fairs in Paris (1878) and Chicago (1893). In Russia, he was responsible for the influential polychrome pavilions at the Polytechnic Exposition of 1872 in Moscow and the Nizhny Novgorod Fair of 1896.

Among the more permanent works ascribed to Ropet are the Bassin Apartment House in St. Petersburg and the Russian Embassy in Tokyo.

Works

References

Literature

External links
Article in the Krugosvet Encyclopedia

1845 births
1908 deaths
19th-century architects from the Russian Empire
Russian artists
Russian Revival architecture
People from Saint Petersburg Governorate